Cambridge Arts Theatre is a 666-seat theatre on Peas Hill and St Edward's Passage in central Cambridge, England. The theatre presents a varied mix of drama, dance, opera and pantomime. It attracts some of the highest-quality touring productions in the country, as well as many shows direct from, or prior to, seasons in the West End. Its annual Christmas pantomime is an established tradition in the city. From 1969 to 1985, the theatre was also home to the Cambridge Theatre Company, a renowned national touring company. The Cambridge Arts Theatre was founded in 1936 by the famous Cambridge economist and statesman John Maynard Keynes.

The Cambridge Arts Theatre has also been home to performances of Cambridge University's Marlowe Society, and it provides a venue for the university's triennial Cambridge Greek Play performed in Ancient Greek. In previous years it also housed performances by Footlights, the Cambridge University Gilbert & Sullivan Society and the Cambridge University Musical Theatre Society.

History 

The Cambridge Arts Theatre opened on 3 February 1936 with a gala performance by the Vic-Wells Ballet, featuring among others Robert Helpmann, Margot Fonteyn and Frederick Ashton.

The theatre was paid for by a share scheme supervised by its founder John Maynard Keynes, at a cost of £15,000.  When only £2,300 was raised by subscription of the town, Dr Keynes underwrote the rest himself.  Intending to represent both "town and gown", the Trust included the Provost of King's College, its English and Music professors, the mayor and the deputy mayor.  Keynes' wife, the renowned dancer Lydia Lopokova was also key to the theatre's foundation.
The first manager was Norman Higgins.

Dadie Rylands went on to be the theatre's chairman from 1946 to 1982.  The theatre hosted the world première of Harold Pinter's The Birthday Party in 1958. Other premières have included Secrets Every Smart Traveler Should Know and Someone Like You. In September 2008 it hosted the world premiere of a new stage adaptation of Tracy Chevalier's play Girl with a Pearl Earring, prior to a transfer to the West End. Artists to have appeared here include Ian McKellen (in a Marlowe Society production of Cymbeline), Derek Jacobi, and, more recently Susan Hampshire, Nigel Havers, Simon Callow, and Warren Mitchell.

In 2013 the front of house and bar facilities were remodelled and an extra entrance created. This work was awarded to Burrell Foley Fischer and the work commended in the sustainability category of the 2014 Cambridge Design and Construction awards.

Cambridge Theatre Company
The Cambridge Arts Theatre was home to the Cambridge Theatre Company (established in 1969), which became one of the most respected and influential touring companies in the UK.  Formed as a sister company to Toby Robertson's Prospect Theatre Company and Ian McKellen's Actors' Company (presented as part of CTC), the Cambridge Theatre Company enjoyed enormous loyalty in its home town, and many excellent emerging actors were featured in its wide repertoire.

Under Jonathan Lynn (1976–1981) many of the company's productions transferred to the West End. Lynn, a 1963 Cambridge graduate along with John Cleese and others in the Footlights, used his many contacts to build up a successful repertoire of quality drama. He commissioned plays from Frederic Raphael (After the Greek) and Royce Ryton (The Unvarnished Truth with Tim Brooke Taylor and Graeme Garden), and his production of Songbook, a spoof musical by Julian More and Monty Norman, transferred to London in 1978.

Like the Prospect Theatre Company and the Actors' Company, CTC initially operated a repertory system of a company of around 14 actors.   For example, the 1974 six-play season featured Zoë Wanamaker, Oliver Ford Davies, Roger Rees and Ian Charleson. Sheila Hancock was a regular under Lynn, becoming Associate Director. Maureen Lipman starred in her husband Jack Rosenthal's play Smash! based on the ill-fated West End musical Bar Mitzvah Boy, itself based on the smash hit 1976 television play of the same name in which Lynn and Lipman had featured.

During the 1970s and early 1980s a primary function of the Cambridge Theatre Company, along with the Oxford Playhouse Company, was to provide middle-scale theatres such as in Harlow, Swindon, Darlington, Mold, Southampton, Croydon, Peterborough, Cardiff, and Stirling with good quality touring drama. The company's Arts Council of Great Britain grant was dependent on this.

The directors of the company were Richard Cottrell (1969–1975), Robert Lang (1975–1976), Jonathan Lynn (1976–1981), Bill Pryde (1981–1988), Robin Midgley (1988–1991), and Mike Alfreds (1991–1999). The company's headquarters were moved to London and its name was changed to "Method and Madness" in 1995. In 1999 the company dissolved in the face of declining interest in quality drama in the provinces.

Notes

External links

Cambridge Arts Theatre website

1936 establishments in England
Theatres in Cambridge
Culture of the University of Cambridge
Theatres completed in 1936